Descôteaux v Mierzwinski, [1982] 1 SCR 860 is a leading Supreme Court of Canada decision on solicitor-client privilege. The court reaffirmed the opinion in R. v. Solosky that privilege was a substantive right that even existed outside of a proceeding.

Background 
The police were investigating the legal aid bureau in Montreal in relation to a charge on Marcellein Ledoux for falsely stating his financial status in order to qualify for the services. The police had a search warrant seize the records from the legal aid interview with Ledoux and the legal aid application he filled out. The clinic appealed the seizure on the basis that the documents were protected by solicitor-client privilege.

Opinion of the court 
Justice Lamer, writing for a unanimous court, held that the documents were not wrongly seized. The trial court erred when dismissing the motion for certiorari to quash the warrant, but not because the documents were privileged. 

The Superior Court had refused to quash the warrant on the basis that the documents could not benefit from solicitor-client privilege, as they were communicated before any solicitor-client relationship was formalized. This was not in accordance with the case law, as any information communicated with the intent of obtaining legal advice falls within the scope of solicitor-client privilege, even in the lawyer is not retained and legal advice is never given. 

However, the legal aid application falls within one of the exceptions to solicitor-client privilege, known as the crime-fraud exception: any communication made for the purpose of obtaining legal advice to facilitate the commission of a crime, or any communication which itself is the material element of a crime, does not benefit from the principle of privilege. 

The Court formulates the 4-point substantive rule of the privilege, which it states was put forth in Solosky, but was not formulated explicitly. 

Lamer described the privilege as:

He stated that where a law interferes with the right to privilege then the privilege must prevail except for where it is absolutely necessary in order to achieve the purpose of the enabling legislation.

Notes

External links 
 full text of Supreme Court decision from canlii.org

Canadian evidence case law
Supreme Court of Canada cases
1982 in Canadian case law
Legal professional privilege
Evidentiary privilege case law